Jørn Irving Goldstein (born March 27, 1953) is a Norwegian Olympic ice hockey player.

Biography
Goldstein was born in Oslo, Norway, and is Jewish.  His mother's family, surname Schapow, immigrated to Norway from Lithuania in the early 1900s. His father, Otto Goldstein, arrived in 1947 from Germany, a Holocaust survivor who survived and was liberated in World War II from Nazi Germany's concentration camps. The family eventually moved to Ila, Trondheim.

As an 18-year old Goldstein joined Manglerud Star Ishockey, and became the team's goalkeeper. Goldstein played for the Norwegian national ice hockey team, and participated at the Winter Olympics in 1984. He was awarded Gullpucken as best Norwegian ice hockey player in 1977.

In 1983, Norwegian director Oddvar Bull Tuhus made a movie entitled Hockey Fever, in which Goldstein has a central role.

See also
List of select Jewish ice hockey players

References

External links

1953 births
Living people
Ice hockey players at the 1984 Winter Olympics
Jewish ice hockey players
Norwegian ice hockey goaltenders
Norwegian Jews
Olympic ice hockey players of Norway
Ice hockey people from Oslo